Sirom-e Olya (also Romanized as Sīrom-e ʿOlyā) is a village in Tang-e Haft Rural District, Papi District, Khorramabad County, Lorestan Province, Iran. At the 2006 census, its population was 44, in 10 families.

References 

Towns and villages in Khorramabad County